Steiner Ranch is a planned community and census-designated place (CDP) in Travis County, Texas, United States. It was first listed as a CDP prior to the 2020 census.

It is in the west-central part of the county, occupying  on a ridge running within a large bend on the north side of the Colorado River between Lake Travis and Lake Austin.

Real estate developer Al Hughes initially purchased the land for development in the late 1980s from the Steiner family. The neighborhood grew throughout the 1990s and, as of 2017, had a population of around 15,000. It currently contains three elementary schools, one middle school and a variety of community parks, recreation centers and trails.

Demographics 
Steiner Ranch's total population, as of 2021, is 17,780, with 8,748 males and 9,032 females. The median age is 40.7. The total number of households in 5,867 with an average of 3 people per household. Families account for 4,334 of those households, and non-families, 1,533. Of those households, 3,148 have children. 1,626 Steiner residents are self-employed, while 5,650 work for private companies. Governmental workers number 877 and those working for non-profit companies, 432.

Education 
Steiner Ranch is located in Leander Independent School District. It contains three elementary schools:

 Steiner Ranch Elementary School
 Laura Welch Bush Elementary School
 River Ridge Elementary School

The community also contains one middle school: Canyon Ridge Middle School. High School students attend Vandegrift High School located at 9500 McNeil Drive, Austin, TX 78750.

References 

Populated places in Travis County, Texas
Census-designated places in Travis County, Texas
Census-designated places in Texas